José Daniel Valencia (born 3 October 1955) is an Argentine former professional footballer who played as an attacking midfielder. He is perhaps most famous for having been part of the 1978 World Cup winning squad.

Club career
Valencia started his club career at Gimnasia y Esgrima de Jujuy but was soon transferred to Talleres de Córdoba, the club at which he would play most of his career.

At Talleres, Valencia suffered the disappointment of finishing runner-up in Nacional 1977, finishing third in Metropolitano 1980, and losing the semi-finals on four occasions.

In 1986, he  had a spell in Ecuadorian football with Liga Deportiva Universitaria de Quito, but only stayed one year before returning to Talleres for a further two seasons.

In 1988, he left Talleres to play for third division club Guaraní Antonio Franco in Misiones, Argentina. After a short spell in the lower leagues, he made a brief return to the first division with Rosario Central in 1989 before moving to Bolivia where he played for Club Jorge Wilstermann and then Club San José.

At San José, he again experienced the disappointment of being a losing finalist on two occasions; in the 1991 Clausura and the 1992 season. He also got his first taste of Copa Libertadores football, but with little success, as San José finished bottom of their group in both 1992 and 1993.

Valencia retired from club football in 1993 at the age of 37.

International career
The highlight of Valencia's footballing career came in 1978 when he was selected to represent Argentina at the FIFA World Cup tournament. Although he featured in the first game, he was dropped due to a tactical reshuffle by manager César Luis Menotti. He was unlucky to miss out on the World Cup final in the Monumental stadium, but he did play a part in helping Argentina win their first World Cup.

Valencia was selected to play for Argentina at 1982 World Cup, but the team had a disappointing campaign, eliminated in the second group phase. He retired from international football at the end of the tournament, having represented his country 41 times, scoring five goals.

Honours

Club
Talleres de Córdoba
 Copa Hermandad: 1977
 Liga Cordobesa de Fútbol: 1975, 1976, 1977, 1978, 1979

International
Argentina
 FIFA World Cup: 1978

References

External links

 
 

1955 births
Living people
Argentine footballers
FIFA World Cup-winning players
1978 FIFA World Cup players
1982 FIFA World Cup players
1975 Copa América players
1979 Copa América players
Gimnasia y Esgrima de Jujuy footballers
Talleres de Córdoba footballers
Rosario Central footballers
C.D. Jorge Wilstermann players
Club San José players
L.D.U. Quito footballers
Sportspeople from Jujuy Province
Argentina international footballers
Argentine expatriate footballers
Argentine Primera División players
Argentine expatriate sportspeople in Ecuador
Expatriate footballers in Ecuador
Argentine expatriate sportspeople in Bolivia
Expatriate footballers in Bolivia
Association football midfielders
Pan American Games bronze medalists for Argentina
Pan American Games medalists in football
Medalists at the 1975 Pan American Games
Footballers at the 1975 Pan American Games
Club San José managers